The SRO GT Anniversary by Peter Auto is a one off auto racing event held at Circuit de Spa-Francorchamps, Belgium, on 28-30 July 2022. The races will be contested with GT1, GT2 and GT3-spec cars. The event promoters are Peter Auto and the Stéphane Ratel Organisation (SRO).

Entry List
A 28-car field will gather to contest both race - 11 GT1 cars, 10 GT2 cars and 7 GT3 cars. 8 manufacterers are represented.

Practice and qualifying

Race 1

Race 2

References

External links
 

Auto races in Belgium
2022 in Belgian motorsport